Funa laterculoides is a species of sea snail, a marine gastropod mollusk in the family Pseudomelatomidae, the turrids and allies.

Description
The shell grows to a length of  20 mm.

Distribution
This species occurs off the coasts of South Africa.

References

External links
 
 

Endemic fauna of South Africa
laterculoides
Gastropods described in 1958